Claudia Lagona (born 23 May 1987), better known by her stage name Levante, is an Italian singer-songwriter, novel writer and model. She rose to fame in the 2010s, publishing four albums and several media success singles and collaborations, reaching the top ten on the Italian Albums Chart three times. She has written songs for several Italian artists and has collaborated with Gianni Morandi, Irene Grandi, Max Gazzè, The Kolors, J-Ax, Tiziano Ferro and Carmen Consoli.

Levante has sold over 360,000 records in Italy and received a MTV Europe Music Award nomination and several Italian music achievements, including Premio Tenco, Academy Medimex and a participation at Sanremo Music Festival in 2020 and in 2023. In 2019 Vogue included her in their "100 people who can influence world trends in fashion and art" list.

In 2017, she was chosen as a judge for the eleventh series of the Italian talent show X Factor. She has also written three novels.

Career 
She first signed a contract with A&A Recordings Publishing and Atollo Records, with whom she recorded the song "Troppodiva" under the name of Levante, but later left Turin to go to Leeds, UK. After coming back in Italy she opened for the concerts of Max Gazzè's Sotto casa Tour, on 11 March 2014 her first album Manuale distruzione was released, making its debut at number 8 on the Fimi Albums Chart. The album was subsequently awarded as Best First Work by the Academy Medimex. She extracts the singles "Cuori d'artificio" and "Duri come me", obtaining a fair success that allows her to receive a nomination at the MTV Europe Music Award as Best Italian Act and open the concerts of the Italian band Negramaro.

Levante participated in the 2015 edition of the South by Southwest festival in Texas, and also played in Los Angeles and New York City. In May 2015, the new album Abbi cura di te is released for Carosello Records, entering on the top20 of Italian Albums Chart. From the album Levante releases four singles published during the year will be extracted: "Ciao per sempre", "Till death do not separate us", "Abbi Cura di Te" and "Le lacrime non macchiano".

On 19 January 2017 is published the book written by Levante "Se non ti vedo non esisti", published by Rizzoli. On 1 February 2017 she releases the single "Non me interessa niente niente", which anticipates her third studio album Nel chaos di stanze stupefacenti, released on 7 April 2017, which reaching number two on Italian Albums Chart and is certified gold by Fimi. The singles "Non Me Ne Frega Niente" and "Pezzo di Me" feat Max Gazzè obtain the gold and platinum certification respectively. On 19 May 2017 she joined the cast of coaches and judges at the eleventh edition of the talent show X Factor as a judge together with Fedez, Manuel Agnelli and Mara Maionchi. In 2017 Levante wrote and composed the lyrics for the single from "Le parole che non dico mai" that Rita Bellanza presented on stage at X Factor; she also wrote a song for the new album by Gianni Morandi D'amore d'autore, entitled "Mediterraneo".

In the first months of 2018 the stages of Europe and Italy with the "Chaos in Europe and Chaos In Teatro tours" solding out on over 30 dates. In the summer of the same year she collaborated with Diplo and MØ on the single "Stay Open". On 13 November 2018, on the other hand, the second novel, " Questa è l'ultima volta che ti dimentico", which immediately reached the top ten sales in Italy. Also in November 2018 she collaborated with Stash on the J-Ax and Fedez hit "Assenzio", becoming the singer's first single to reach the first position in Italy and selling over 200,000 copies.

In 2019 she duets in the song "Un motivo maledetto" with Irene Grandi, one of the first hits of the Tuscan singer of 1994. The duet was included in her celebratory album Grandissimo. At the beginning of 2019, a report on the prestigious special issue of Vogue, the annual guide to the 100 people who can influence world trends in fashion and art, is dedicated to the artist. On 5 March 2019 she signed a contract with the major Warner Music Group, with whom she released her fourth album entitled Magmamemoria on 4 October, which debuted and peaked at number four on the FIMI sales charts. To anticipate the album, the singles "Andrà tutto bene", released on 5 April 2019 and "Lo stretto necessario", in duet with Carmen Consoli. On 27 September is released the third single "Bravi Tutti Voi". On 31 December 2019, her participation in the Sanremo Music Festival is announced with the song "Tikibombom". At the end of the festival the song became her second top10 single peaking at number eight.

On 4 December 2022, it was officially announced Levante participation in the Sanremo Music Festival 2023. "Vivo" was later announced as her entry for the Sanremo Music Festival 2023.

Artistry and music influences 
When Vogue included Levante in the "100 people who can influence world trends in fashion and art" list in 2019, Levante explained her writing process: "I found refuge from the pain of his loss in music" and "When I write, I put down whatever comes to me and flows out spontaneously. I am extremely descriptive and I discovered that through my writing, I am capable of delving under the surface of feelings and emotions so deeply that I can really connect with my readers' hearts. This is more difficult when it comes to writing songs, also because you don't have as much time to connect." She describes the current pop scene as "very chaotic," and she considers its madness as symbolic of everything else happening in the world. "I think it is a consequence of the period we are living in" she says.

Levante's music influences comes from Italian songwriter Carmen Consoli to American singer Alanis Morissette. In an interview by Grazia she cites Mina, Cristina Donà, Janis Joplin, Tori Amos and Kristina Train. She also explains "I'm not that stationary in the ratings. I really listen to everything, ranging in genres... Surely pop is my favorite, but I have a very high and cultured consideration of this genre. When I talk about pop, I also put Nirvana in the middle."

Discography

Albums

Singles

Author and songwriter for other singers 
Collaborations authorship and / or compositions are listed in parentheses in the title.

Filmography and  TV programs 

 X Factor, season 11, 2017 – coach and judge
 Sanremo Music Festival, 70° edition, 2020 – contestant
 Sanremo Music Festival, 73° edition, 2023 – contestant

Modeling 

 Model for Trussardi 's campaign #VisionaryElegance (2016)
 New face for TV spot by S'Agapoò Jewelry (2017)
 Testimonial for Huawei (2017)
 Testimonial for L'Oréal (2018–present)
 Model for Prada (2019)
 Model and testimonial for Diadora (2019–present)
 Testimonial for Yves Saint Laurent Beauty (2020–present)

Authored book 

 . Milan, Rizzoli Libri. 2017.
 . Milan. Rizzoli Libri. 2018.

References

1987 births
Living people
People from Caltagirone
Italian women singer-songwriters
Italian singer-songwriters
Italian pop singers
21st-century Italian singers
21st-century Italian women singers
Musicians from the Province of Catania